Kakapora railway station is a railway station in the Northern Railway zone of Indian Railways. It is one of the four stations in Pulwama district, others being Awantipora railway station, Pampore railway station and Panzgam railway station respectively.

Location
The station is situated in notified area of Kakapora in Pulwama district about 20 km south of Srinagar.

History

The station has been built as part of the Jammu–Baramulla line megaproject, aiming to link the Kashmir Valley with Jammu Tawi the rest of the Indian railway network. The Leg 2 section of this network is incomplete. It is expected to be completed by 2017.

Design
Like every other station in this mega project, this station also features Kashmiri wood architecture, with an intended ambience of a royal court which is designed to complement the local surroundings to the station. Station signage is predominantly in Urdu, English and Hindi.

See also
Anantnag railway station

References

Railway stations in Pulwama district
Kashmir
Firozpur railway division